Free Again is the fourth album by German singer Lou Bega, released on 21 May 2010 in Germany, Austria and Switzerland. It has since been released in other countries.

Track listing

 "Boyfriend" - 2:51
 "Sweet Like Cola" - 3:23
 "Mommy is Hot" - 3:50
 "Jump Into My Bed" - 3:32
 "I’m a Singer" - 3:10
 "Beautiful World" - 3:21
 "A Man is Not a Woman" - 2:55
 "My Day" - 3:08
 "Lucky Punch" - 2:30
 "You’re a Liar" - 2:42
 "1 No. 1" - 1:59
 "Ballin'" - 3:34
 "Josephine's Jeans" - 3:00

Personnel
Adapted from AllMusic.

 Petra Bonmassar – vocals
 André Carol – trumpet
 Hans-Philipp Graf – mastering
 Roman Lüth – composer, instrumentation, producer
 Wolfgang Webenau – producer, instrumentation
 Fritz Michallik – programming, instrumentation, producer
 Bridger Fogle – choir, chorus
 Alex Heil – artwork
 Max Lengert – composer
 Massimiliano Emili – guitar
 Lucas Finn – composer
 Billy King – choir, chorus
 Lou Bega – liner notes
 Achim Kleist – producer, instrumentation
 Jörg Sander – guitar

References

2010 albums
Lou Bega albums